The 2021 Newcastle Knights season was the 34th in the club's history. Coached by Adam O'Brien and co-captained by Jayden Brailey, Kalyn Ponga and Daniel Saifiti, they competed in the NRL's 2021 Telstra Premiership. In July, the NRL relocated the competition to Queensland to avoid an outbreak of the Deltra variant COVID-19 virus in New South Wales. The Knights finished the regular season in 7th place (out of 16), thus reaching the finals but were knocked out after losing to the Parramatta Eels in week 1.

Squad

Transfers and Re-signings

Gains

Losses

Promoted juniors

Change of role

Re-signings

Player contract situations

Ladder

Milestones
 Round 1: Jayden Brailey captained his 1st game for the club.
 Round 1: Tyson Frizell made his debut for the club, after previously playing for the St. George Illawarra Dragons.
 Round 1: Daniel Saifiti played his 100th career game and captained his 1st game for the club.
 Round 1: Sauaso Sue made his debut for the club, after previously playing for the Canterbury-Bankstown Bulldogs.
 Round 2: Jayden Brailey scored his 1st try for the club.
 Round 3: Tyson Frizell scored his 1st try for the club.
 Round 3: Mitchell Pearce played his 300th career game.
 Round 3: Dom Young made his NRL debut for the club, after previously playing for the Huddersfield Giants.
 Round 4: Kurt Mann kicked his 1st career field goal.
 Round 5: Chris Randall scored his 1st career try.
 Round 6: Hymel Hunt played his 50th game for the club.
 Round 6: Brodie Jones scored his 1st career try.
 Round 6: Brayden Musgrove made his NRL debut for the club.
 Round 8: David Klemmer played his 50th game for the club.
 Round 8: Brayden Musgrove scored his 1st career try.
 Round 8: Sauaso Sue played his 150th career game.
 Round 9: Connor Watson played his 50th game for the club.
 Round 10: Mitchell Barnett played his 100th career game.
 Round 11: Phoenix Crossland kicked his 1st career goal.
 Round 11: Simi Sasagi made his NRL debut for the club.
 Round 11: Sauaso Sue scored his 1st try for the club.
 Round 12: Mitchell Barnett played his 100th game for the club.
 Round 12: Enari Tuala played his 50th career game.
 Round 13: Jake Clifford made his debut for the club, after previously playing for the North Queensland Cowboys.
 Round 13: Mat Croker made his NRL debut for the club.
 Round 13: Jack Johns made his debut for the club, after previously playing for the South Sydney Rabbitohs.
 Round 14: Jake Clifford kicked his 1st goal for the club.
 Round 14: Kurt Mann played his 50th game for the club.
 Round 14: Dom Young scored his 1st career try.
 Round 16: Hymel Hunt played his 100th career game.
 Round 21: Jake Clifford played his 50th career game and scored his 1st try for the club.
 Round 21: Kalyn Ponga captained his 1st game for the club.
 Round 22: Connor Watson played his 100th career game.
 Round 23: Jirah Momoisea made his NRL debut for the club.
 Round 25: Jack Johns scored his 1st career try.

Jerseys and sponsors
In 2021, the Knights' jerseys were made by O'Neills and their major sponsor was nib Health Funds.

Fixtures

Pre-season Trials

Statistics

31 players used.

Source:

Representative honours

The following players appeared in a representative match or were named in a representative squad in 2021.

Emerging Blues squad
Bradman Best
Tex Hoy
Jacob Saifiti

New South Wales
Daniel Saifiti

Queensland
Kurt Mann (18th man)
Kalyn Ponga

Individual honours

Newcastle Knights awards

 Player of the Year (Danny Buderus Medal): Jacob Saifiti
 Excalibur Club Players' Player: Connor Watson
 Gladiator of the Year: Jayden Brailey
 Community Player of the Year: Josh King
 Rookie of the Year: Brodie Jones
 Knight in Shining Armour: Mitchell Pearce
 Club Person of the Year: Mathew Morris & Jane Farrell
 NSW Cup Player of the Year: Zac Hosking
 NSW Cup Excalibur Club Players' Player: Mat Croker & Luke Huth

References

Newcastle Knights seasons
Newcastle Knights season
2021 NRL Women's season